The Totnansberg, occasionally also called the Totmannsberg, is the highest peak in the Black Mountains, a subunit of the Rhön in central Germany.

References 

Mountains under 1000 metres
Mountains of Bavaria
Mountains and hills of the Rhön